Catherine Rachel da Costa (1679–1756),  Mendes, was an English miniaturist. She grew up in London and studied painting under Bernard Lens III. Most of her surviving portraits are of family and friends, and there is also a picture of Mary Queen of Scots. Da Costa was the first female Anglo-Jewish artist of note. In her personal life, she married Moses da Costa and had six children.

Early life 

Catherine Rachel Mendes was the eldest daughter of Fernando and Isabel Mendes, Portuguese Jews who had fled the Spanish Inquisition and married in London. Her father was doctor to both King Charles II and Queen consort Catherine of Braganza, having converted to Roman Catholicism. Catherine Mendes was baptized at Somerset House (but given the Jewish name of Rachel) and Catherine of Braganza became her godmother.

The family lived between Budge Row in the City of London and Highgate House (later known as Cromwell House), sharing the houses with Fernando Mendes' cousin Alvaro da Costa and raising the children as Jews. On 13 August 1698, Catherine Mendes married da Costa's son Moses da Costa in a synagogue. Moses da Costa was a wealthy merchant and together with him, Catherine da Costa had six children.

Career 
Catherine da Costa was taught to paint miniature portraits by Bernard Lens III and most of her surviving works are portraits of friends and family. These include a miniature of her ten year-old son Abraham da Costa which is now owned by the Jewish Museum. However, a full-length watercolour portrait of her father hangs in the Bevis Marks Synagogue and da Costa also painted the Imaginary Portrait of Mary, Queen of Scots (1542–1587), which hangs at Ham House in Surrey.

Da Costa was well-regarded as a painter and also impressed Voltaire with her wit when he visited London in the mid-1720s. He recorded an exchange between her and a priest in his notebooks:

Death and legacy 
Catherina da Costa died on 11 December 1756 and was buried in the Mile End Jewish cemetery. Her son Abraham inherited her artworks and some are now owned by the Joods Historisch Museum in Amsterdam. She was the first female Anglo-Jewish artist of note.

A book called Smitten by Catherine was published in 2016 about her life and work.

Gallery

Notes 
  "Madame Acosta dit en ma presence a un abbé qui vouloit la faire chrêtienne. Votre Dieu, est il né juif? Ouy. Est il mort juif? Ouy. Eh bien soyez donc juif".

References

Further reading 

1679 births
1756 deaths
17th-century English painters
18th-century English painters
18th-century English women artists
Curiel family
Da Costa family
English people of Portuguese-Jewish descent
English Sephardi Jews
Painters from London
People from the City of London
Portrait miniaturists
English women painters